A list of superlatives is a list consisting of items regarded as superlative.  Both items and their qualities can be arrived at objectively and subjectively.

An example of an objective list is Tallest buildings by height.  An example of a purely subjective list is any ranking the Greatest of All Time (G.O.A.T.) at anything, from inventors and generals to Presidents and athletes.  Similar subjective lists include such topics as "Best and Worst Dressed", "Most Beautiful Women of Hollywood" and "Sexiest Man Alive", named by People magazine annually since 1985.

Such rankings were successfully parodied by Dos Equis beer in a long-running ad campaign featuring actor Jonathan Goldsmith, The Most Interesting Man in the World, which aired from 2006 to 2016.

Examples at Wikipedia include:
 List of superlative trees - which ranks trees by such objective qualities as tallest, oldest, and largest leaves, and such subjective ones as "stoutest" and broadest.
 List of automotive superlatives - which includes rankings by the smallest, largest, fastest, and best-selling, as well as "firsts" such as the first with a passive restraint, climate control, and in-car entertainment.
 List of superlative Academy Award winners and nominees - which includes multiple winners and nominees for awards such as Best Picture, Best Director, Best Actor, etc., ranked within each category by the most of each.

References